André Betta (born 4 March 1943 in Beaune, Côte-d'Or) is a former professional French football midfielder.

Club career
Betta played for several clubs, most notably Rouen, Rennes, FC Metz and Reims.

References

External links
 
 
 Profile on French federation official site
 

1943 births
Living people
People from Beaune
French footballers
France international footballers
Association football midfielders
FC Rouen players
FC Girondins de Bordeaux players
Stade Rennais F.C. players
FC Metz players
Stade de Reims players
Ligue 1 players
CO Roubaix-Tourcoing players
Sportspeople from Côte-d'Or
Footballers from Bourgogne-Franche-Comté